The Salem Downtown State Street – Commercial Street Historic District comprises a portion of the central business district of Salem, Oregon, United States. Located on the Willamette River transportation corridor and near Jason Lee's Mission Mill, Salem's downtown area was first platted in 1846. Subsequent development patterns closely reflected the drivers of Salem's growth as an important agricultural and commercial center. Surviving buildings represent a wide range of architectural styles from the 1860s through the 1950s. The district was added to the National Register of Historic Places in 2001.

See also
National Register of Historic Places listings in Marion County, Oregon
Adolph Block
Bush–Breyman Block
Capitol Center (Oregon)
Elsinore Theatre
Salem's Historic Grand Theatre
Pacific Building (Salem, Oregon)
Reed Opera House and McCornack Block Addition

References

External links

Historic districts on the National Register of Historic Places in Oregon
National Register of Historic Places in Salem, Oregon